Brian Kelly is a British television director. He has worked on several high-profile British television drama series, including Sea of Souls, Taggart, Monarch of the Glen, Holby City and The Watch. In 2006, he took charge of directing the first block of episodes of the Doctor Who spinoff series Torchwood. In 2014 he directed several episodes of the STARZ drama Outlander.

References

External links

British television directors
Living people
Place of birth missing (living people)
Year of birth missing (living people)